Latin American migration to Finland means immigrants from Latin America who reside in Finland.

Languages
Spanish is spoken by 8,099 people in Finland and Portuguese by 3,024, this includes both Spaniards and Portuguese people.

Notable people
 Mexican 
 Sara Ferrara, track cyclist
 Ruudolf, hip hop artist
 Sofia Sida, singer

 Argentine 
 Monica Sileoni, gymnast
 Maximo Tolonen, footballer

 Colombian 
 Felipe Aspegren, footballer
 Camilo Miettinen, ice hockey player

 Brazilian 
 Getúlio Fredo, football manager
 Luís Fernando da Silva, youth coach

 Puerto Rican 
 Alex Oikkonen, footballer
 Juan Coca, footballer
 Joseph Marrero, footballer

 Chilean 
 Diandra, singer
 Marce Rendic, radio personality

References

Ethnic groups in Finland
Demographics of Finland
Finland